This is a list of people from Ávila, Spain:
Quintana Olleras painter
Priscillian, Christian theologian and martyr
Isabella I of Castile
Blasco Núñez Vela, first viceroy of Peru
Pedro de la Gasca, bishop and diplomat
Pedro de Villagra, governor of Chile
Gil González Dávila, conquistador
John of the Cross, Catholic saint
Gil González Dávila, friar and chronicler
Tomás Luis de Victoria, musician
George Santayana, philosopher and essayist
Claudio Sánchez-Albornoz y Menduiña, President of the Government of the Spanish Republic in Exile

Adolfo Suárez, politician and lawyer
José Jiménez Lozano, narrator, essayist, poet and journalist
Feliciano Rivilla, footballer
Carlos Sastre, cyclist
Julio Jiménez, professional cyclist
Ángel Hernández, long jumper
Agustín Rodríguez Sahagún, politician
Ángel Acebes, politician
Sonsoles Espinosa, wife of former Prime Minister of Spain, José Luis Rodríguez Zapatero

See also
Teresa of Avila

References 

Avila
 List